Kimberly Prost (born June 4, 1958) is a Canadian judge on the International Criminal Court. She was elected to a nine-year term on December 8, 2017 and assumed full-time duty on March 9, 2018. 

She is the third Canadian Judge to have served on the International Criminal Tribunal for the former Yugoslavia (following Jules Deschênes and Sharon Williams). Prior to her election to the bench, she served as Chef du Cabinet to the President of the International Criminal Court. From June 2010 to August 2015, she was the first Ombudsperson for the UN Security Council's Al-Qaeda Sanctions Committee, tasked with advising the Committee and making recommendations on requests from individuals or organizations who are subject to global sanctions, such as asset freezes and travel bans, as a result of "listing" by this committee.

History
Kimberly Prost graduated as a gold medalist from the Faculty of Law at the University of Manitoba. She joined the Canadian Federal Department of Justice in 1982 and worked for five years at the Winnipeg regional office as a federal prosecutor. In 1987, she joined the Department of Justice’s Crimes against Humanity and War Crimes Unit in Ottawa, and worked as head of the Baltic team on possible prosecutions for genocide, war crimes and crimes against humanity. In 1990, she took a position within the International Assistance Group, which acts as Canada's central authority for international cooperation on criminal matters, and was named the Director of the organization in 1994. As Director of the IAG, she participated in the negotiation of over 40 bilateral extradition and mutual Legal Assistance treaties for Canada with other countries.

She joined the Canadian delegation for the negotiations of the Rome Statute for an International Criminal Court and she participated in the negotiation of the related Rules of Procedure and Evidence. She was on the Canadian delegation to the Ad Hoc Committee for the negotiation of the United Nations Convention against Transnational Organized Crime and the UN Convention against Corruption. 

In July 2000, she joined the Commonwealth Secretariat as Head of the Criminal Law section, Deputy Director of the Legal and Constitutional Affairs Division where she championed a broad program to deliver assistance to member countries in a range of criminal justice programs. She ran an intensive pan-Commonwealth program on counter-terrorism legislation and implementation of the relevant international instruments, as well as police and prosecutor training in the investigation and prosecution of terrorism and terrorist financing. She has also managed a project which brought together experts to develop model legislation for implementation of the Rome Statute.

She joined the United Nations Office on Drugs and Crime in Vienna as Head of the Legal Advisory Section within the Division of Treaty Affairs in March 2005. In June that same year, she was elected by the United Nations General Assembly as an ad litem judge for the International Criminal Tribunal for the Former Yugoslavia. On July 3, 2006 she was sworn in as a judge of the Tribunal where she served for four years on the multi-accused trial of Popovic et al. She was also a Pre-trial and Presiding Judge in the Tolimir case. In June 2010, she was appointed Ombudsperson for the Security Council Al Qaida Sanctions Committee and she served in that post for five years before moving to the International Criminal Court.

She is a member of the Crimes Against Humanity Initiative Advisory Council, a project of the Whitney R. Harris World Law Institute at Washington University in St. Louis School of Law to establish the world’s first treaty on the prevention and punishment of crimes against humanity.

References

Judges
International Criminal Court judges
Canadian diplomats
International Criminal Tribunal for the former Yugoslavia judges
Ombudsmen
University of Manitoba alumni
Canadian lawyers
1958 births
Living people
Canadian women judges
Canadian women diplomats
Robson Hall alumni
Canadian judges of United Nations courts and tribunals
Canadian judges of international courts and tribunals